"" is the national anthem of Mali. Adopted in 1962, it was written by Seydou Badian Kouyaté, while the music is attributed to Banzumana Sissoko. It is popularly known as "" or "".

History
The anthem was written by Seydou Badian Kouyaté around the time of the dissolution of the Mali Federation with Senegal in 1960, which left Mali without a flag or anthem. In a 2010 interview, Kouyaté stated that President Modibo Keïta had been passing through his locality when he approached Kouyaté and asked him to create a song to help the youth remember Malian pre-independence politician Mamadou Konaté. Kouyaté created a song called "". Keïta then called Kouyaté and told him to try creating something for the national anthem. Kouyaté made a draft for a national anthem and sang it with Keïta, who was pleased with it. Kouyaté stated that Keïta had previously received a proposal for a national anthem by a European pianist residing in the Malian capital, Bamako, but he rejected it, because he wanted something that had an aura of Africa and Mali. Kouyaté reworked an air dating back to the 13th century and the Mali Empire. The musical arrangement is credited to jeli Banzumana Sissoko.

The anthem was officially adopted just under a year after independence, by law n° 62-72 of 9 August 1962. The Malian Young Pioneer movement of the 1960s translated it into Bambara for its rallies as "". The translation is credited to Abdulay Bari.

Lyrics

References

External links
Mali: Le Mali - Audio of the national anthem of Mali, with information and lyrics (archive link)
Presidency of Mali: Symboles de la République, L'Hymne National du Mali: history and lyrics, updated 13 June 2003.

African anthems
National symbols of Mali
Malian music
1962 songs
National anthem compositions in G major